Ataman (variants: otaman, wataman, vataman; Russian: атаман) was a title of Cossack and haidamak leaders of various kinds. In the Russian Empire, the term was the official title of the supreme military commanders of the Cossack armies. The Ukrainian version of the same word is hetman. Otaman in Ukrainian Cossack forces was a position of a lower rank.

Etymology

The etymologies of the words ataman and hetman are disputed. There may be several independent Germanic and Turkic origins for seemingly cognate forms of the words, all referring to the same concept. The hetman form cognates with German Hauptmann ('captain', literally 'head-man') by the way of Czech or Polish, like several other titles. The Russian term ataman is probably connected to Old East Slavic vatamanŭ, and cognates with Turkic odoman (Ottoman Turks). The term ataman may had also a lingual interaction with Polish hetman and German hauptmann.

Suggestions have been made that the word might be of Turkic origin, literally meaning 'father of horsemen' or 'father of men', 'pure blooded father' or 'eldest man'. Considering the '-man' suffix in turkic languages means men, person, pure blooded or most. Dictionaries assert that the word comes from the German word 'Hauptmann' which means 'head man', 'headman' or 'chieftain' which entered the Russian language through Polish 'hetman'.

Otaman in Ukraine
Otamans were usually elected by the Host Council or could have been appointed, especially during the military campaigns. The appointed otamans were called acting otaman.

In the Cossack Hetmanate, leaders of non-Cossack military units (artillery, etc.) were also called otamans. In the Cossack Hetmanate, the title was used for the administrative purposes, such as the head of the city, City Otaman (городовий отаман). Later such administrative uses were adopted by the Kuban Cossacks and were common in Kuban Oblast with different variations.

There were various types of otaman:
Army otaman, an executive officer in the Zaporizhian Host
Campaign otaman
Kish otaman
Sotennyi otoman and city otaman were the 's lieutenants. Those titles were introduced during the Hetmanate in the 17th century.
Village otoman, an administrative rank in the 17th to 18th centuries
Okruh otaman, a territorial leader
Stanytsia otaman, a territorial leader
Khutir otaman, a territorial leader

Otamans were also in charge of general- and regimental-size artillery units, as well as any volunteer military formations and the Zholdak cavalry.

20th century-present 
Atamans were the titles of supreme leaders of various Cossack armies during the Russian Civil War.

When Ukraine acquired its independence in 1918, the rank took on different value. Among the Ukrainian Sich Riflemen and the Ukrainian Galician Army, it was equivalent to a major, as is the battalion executive officer today. In the Ukrainian People's Republic, the title was of a general rank. Chief Otoman (головний отаман) was the general of the Ukrainian Army who was assisted by his deputies, Acting Otomans.

The head of the army of the Ukrainian People's Republic, in particular, Symon Petliura, was called Supreme Otaman (головний отаман).

Russian-Azerbaijani MMA fighter Rafael Fiziev fights with the nickname "Ataman" as a homage to his mixed Central Asian heritage.

See also
Voivode
Harambaša

References

External links
Encyclopedia of Ukraine main page 

Military organization of Cossacks
Military ranks of Russia
Military ranks of Ukraine
Positions of subnational authority

History of the Cossacks